Cologne Bonn Airport  is the international airport of Germany's fourth-largest city Cologne, and also serves Bonn, the former capital of West Germany. With approximately 12.4 million passengers passing through it in 2017, it is the seventh-largest passenger airport in Germany and the third-largest in terms of cargo operations. By traffic units, which combines cargo and passengers, the airport is in fifth position in Germany. As of March 2015, Cologne Bonn Airport had services to 115 passenger destinations in 35 countries. The airport is named after Cologne native Konrad Adenauer, the first post-war Chancellor of West Germany.

The airport is located in the district of Porz and is surrounded by Wahner Heide, a nature reserve. Cologne Bonn Airport is one of the country's few 24-hour airports and serves as a hub for Eurowings, FedEx Express and UPS Airlines as well as a focus city for several leisure and low-cost airlines. It is also a host of the German and European space agencies DLR and EAC, part of ESA, which train astronauts there for space explorations.

The airport is jointly owned by the City of Cologne (31.12%), the Federal Republic of Germany (30.94%), the State of North Rhine-Westphalia (30.94%), the City of Bonn (6.06%) and two counties: Rhein-Sieg-Kreis (0.59%) and Rheinisch-Bergischer Kreis (0.35%).

History

20th century

In 1938, the first airfield was built on site for the German Luftwaffe. After World War II the British military took over and expanded the airport (as RAF Wahn). A 1,866 m runway was built in this period. In 1950 the airport was opened for civilian air traffic to serve both Cologne and West Germany's then new capital, Bonn, superseding the former Cologne Butzweilerhof Airport. 

The first scheduled international route was London-Cologne/Bonn-Berlin operated by BEA, inaugurated on 1 January 1951. A second and third runway was opened in 1954 and 1961 subsequently. That same year Lufthansa inaugurated the first scheduled intercontinental service from Cologne/Bonn to New York City.

The new passenger termina, which still exists today as Terminal 1, was inaugurated in 1970. The airport's passenger and freight facilities have been extended substantially during the 1970s. In 1978, the airport handled more than 2 million passengers for the first time.
 
Cologne Bonn Airport was chosen by United Parcel Service (UPS) in 1986 as the location for their European hub. TNT Express followed in 1988.

By 1990, the airport handled three million passengers per year. In the mid-1990s the airport started another major expansion program. Several new parking lots, a new control tower and a second terminal were built, and in 2004 a new long-distance railway station connecting the airport with InterCityExpress trains was opened.

21st century
Coinciding with the start of several low-cost airlines in Germany, Cologne/Bonn opened new capacities. This enabled the airport to make competitive offers to the airlines. Consequently, Germanwings and TUIfly started operations from Cologne/Bonn as their hub in the fall of 2002. As a result, the number of passengers in 2003 rose by 43% compared to 2002. These airlines were joined by easyJet in late 2003 and Wizz Air in June 2006.

Also, the Canadian Forces began to use the airport as a staging area to move troops and supplies in support of humanitarian missions and possible anti-terrorism roles.

In 2006, the Brazilian airline BRA provided a twice a week connection to Rio de Janeiro–Galeão, which was discontinued in April 2007 due to problems with the airline. Also in 2006, a daily transatlantic flight to New Jersey's Newark Liberty International Airport by Continental Airlines was established, operating with a Boeing 757-200. This route was discontinued on 4 September 2008 due to a reduction in passenger numbers.

Low-cost carriers Ryanair and Norwegian Air Shuttle began service to Cologne/Bonn in May 2012. In April 2014, Ryanair announced the opening of their fifth German base at Cologne/Bonn Airport for October 2014. In December 2014, Lufthansa announced it would base Eurowings' new long-haul operations at Cologne Bonn Airport with flights to Florida, Southern Africa and the Indian Ocean to start by the end of 2015. Meanwhile, Condor cancelled their service to Varadero after only one season due to the expected competition. In February 2018, Eurowings announced the relocation of all long-haul operations from Cologne consisting of four Airbus A330 aircraft to Düsseldorf Airport by late October 2018 leaving the airport without any long-haul passenger routes again.

Facilities

Cologne Bonn Airport has two passenger terminals which are located directly beside each other:

Terminal 1
The older Terminal 1 is a 1970s building that sports large surfaces of bare concrete in its design. It features a u-shaped main building with shops, restaurants, check-in and service facilities and a visitors deck on its roof as well as the star-shaped piers B and C with five aircraft stands each plus a central airside hall between them added in 2004 with joint security-check facilities, more shops and restaurants as well as three additional stands. All ten stands at both piers feature jet bridges while the other three use walk-boarding. Also several bus-boarding stands are available at the apron. Terminal 1 is used by Eurowings, which occupy most of the landside check-in facilities, Lufthansa and Austrian Airlines. Terminal 1 features its own direct connection to the railway station.

Terminal 2
Construction of Terminal 2 began in June 1997, and operations at the terminal commenced on 21 June 2000. It is located to the north of Terminal 1. Both feature separate check-in facilities but are connected through a landside walkway. As part of a plan-approval procedure the airport is currently seeking approval for building an airside connection between both terminals. Terminal 2 is a modern-style rectangular building made out of glass and steel which is equipped with eight stands with jet bridges as well as several stands for bus-boarding. It is used by several airlines such as Ryanair and Iran Air. Terminal 2 is also directly connected to the airports' railway station via the basement level. The terminal hosts an interdenominational prayer room on its base level.

Airlines and destinations

Passenger
The following airlines offer regular scheduled and charter flights at Cologne Bonn Airport:

Cargo
Cologne Bonn Airport is a major cargo hub in the world mainly due to its function as a hub for FedEx Express and UPS Airlines, which operates 140 flights per week at the airport alone.

Military use
The German Air Force's Executive Transport Wing is based on the south-western side of the airport, adjacent to the Wahn Air Force Barracks. The military part of the airport is also used by the Canadian Forces as an operational support hub.

Statistics

Passengers and freight

Busiest routes

Ground transportation

Train

Cologne/Bonn Airport station is a 4-track railway station on a loop off the Cologne–Frankfurt high-speed line that connects Cologne Bonn Airport to long-distance trains at least once an hour per direction, most of them ICE services. The station lies directly across both terminals under a large glass roof and features direct connections to the basement of Terminal 2 as well as the check-in area at Terminal 1-C. The S-Bahn line S 19 to Düren and regional train line RE 6 to Minden (Westfalen) connect the airport station with via Cologne Main Station. RB 27 and RE 8 between Mönchengladbach and Koblenz calls at the airport station as well.

Car
The airport has its own exit (named Flughafen) on motorway A59 which links it to the city centres of Cologne and Bonn as well as the Ruhrgebiet.

Bus
Local bus lines also connect the airport with Cologne (route 161) and Bonn (route SB60). On 28 October 2015, a new coach terminal opened and is used for remote bus services to other German cities and many other European countries.

Accidents and incidents

 On April 4, 1978, a Spantax Convair 990 landing at Cologne Bonn Airport forgot to pull out the landing gear and the aircraft slid over the runway, resulting in the right wing catching fire. Two fire-fighting vehicles from the airport fire service that happened to be in the immediate vicinity probably prevented casualties in this accident. All 146 people on board escaped unharmed.

See also
 Transport in Germany
 List of airports in Germany

References

External links
 
 Official website
 
 

Airports in North Rhine-Westphalia
Buildings and structures in North Rhine-Westphalia
Transport in Cologne
Porz
Airports established in 1939
Bases of the German Air Force
1939 establishments in Germany
Space Shuttle Emergency Landing Sites